Dietrich of Apolda (died 1302) was a German Dominican hagiographer, writing towards the end of the thirteenth century.

He wrote a popular life of Elizabeth of Hungary, including mythical elements such as the sorcerer Klingsor. He also wrote a lengthy life of St. Dominic, supported by Munio of Zamora.

References
Monika Rener (1993), Die Vita der Heiligen Elisabeth des Dietrich von Apolda

Notes

1302 deaths
German Dominicans
Christian hagiographers
Year of birth unknown
German male non-fiction writers